Félicien Lekim (25 April 1883 – 20 June 1916) was a French gymnast. He competed in the men's artistic individual all-around event at the 1908 Summer Olympics.

References

External links
 

1883 births
1916 deaths
French male artistic gymnasts
Olympic gymnasts of France
Gymnasts at the 1908 Summer Olympics
Sportspeople from Nord (French department)